Strathcarron railway station is a remote railway station on the Kyle of Lochalsh Line, serving the small village of Strathcarron and the larger village of Lochcarron in the Highlands, northern Scotland. ScotRail, who manage the station, operate all services.

History

The station was built by Murdoch Paterson between 1869 and 1870. The station was opened to passengers on 19 August 1870 by the Dingwall and Skye Railway. The lattice-girder footbridge was built by the Rose Street Foundry in 1900.

Facilities 
Both platforms have waiting rooms and benches, and platform one - which is adjacent to the car park - also has a help point. Both platforms have step-free access, although the footbridge does not. As there are no facilities to purchase tickets, passengers must buy one in advance, or from the guard on the train.

Platform layout
The Radio Electronic Token Block (RETB) was installed by British Rail.

Passenger volume 

The statistics cover twelve month periods that start in April.

Services 
Four trains per day each way call at the station Mon-Sat, with two each way on summer Sundays and a single service each way on Sundays in winter.

References

Bibliography

External links 

 Video footage of the station on YouTube

Railway stations in Highland (council area)
Railway stations served by ScotRail
Railway stations in Great Britain opened in 1870
Former Highland Railway stations